The Seagull is a play by Russian dramatist Anton Chekhov, written in 1895 and first produced in 1896. The Seagull is generally considered to be the first of his four major plays. It dramatises the romantic and artistic conflicts between four characters: the famous middlebrow story writer Boris Trigorin, the ingenue Nina, the fading actress Irina Arkadina, and her son the symbolist playwright Konstantin Treplev.

Like Chekhov's other full-length plays, The Seagull relies upon an ensemble cast of diverse, fully-developed characters. In contrast to the melodrama of mainstream 19th-century theatre, lurid actions (such as Konstantin's suicide attempts) are not shown onstage. Characters tend to speak in subtext rather than directly. The character Trigorin is considered one of Chekhov's greatest male roles. 

The opening night of the first production was a famous failure. Vera Komissarzhevskaya, playing Nina, was so intimidated by the hostility of the audience that she lost her voice. Chekhov left the audience and spent the last two acts behind the scenes. When supporters wrote to him that the production later became a success, he assumed that they were merely trying to be kind. When Konstantin Stanislavski, the seminal Russian theatre practitioner of the time, directed it in 1898 for his Moscow Art Theatre, the play was a triumph. Stanislavski's production became "one of the greatest events in the history of Russian theatre and one of the greatest new developments in the history of world drama".

Stanislavski's direction caused The Seagull to be perceived as a tragedy through overzealousness with the concept of subtext, whereas Chekhov intended it to be a comedy.

Writing 

Chekhov purchased the Melikhovo farm in 1892, where he ordered a lodge built in the middle of a cherry orchard. The lodge had three rooms, one containing a bed and another a writing table. Chekhov eventually moved in and in a letter written in October 1895 wrote:
I am writing a play which I shall probably not finish before the end of November. I am writing it not without pleasure, though I swear fearfully at the conventions of the stage. It's a comedy, there are three women's parts, six men's, four acts, landscapes (view over a lake); a great deal of conversation about literature, little action, tons of love.
Thus he acknowledged a departure from traditional dramatic action. This departure would become a critical hallmark of the Chekhovian theater. Chekhov's statement also reflects his view of the play as comedy, a viewpoint he would maintain towards all his plays. After the play's disastrous opening night, his friend Aleksey Suvorin chided him as being "womanish" and accused him of being in "a funk." Chekhov vigorously denied this, stating:
Why this libel? After the performance, I had supper at Romanov's. On my word of honor. Then I went to bed, slept soundly, and the next day went home without uttering a sound of complaint. If I had been in a funk I should have run from editor to editor and actor to actor, should have nervously entreated them to be considerate, should nervously have inserted useless corrections, and should have spent two or three weeks in Petersburg fussing over my Seagull, in excitement, in a cold perspiration, in lamentation... I acted as coldly and reasonably as a man who has made an offer, received a refusal, and has nothing left but to go. Yes, my vanity was stung, but you know it was not a bolt from the blue; I was expecting a failure and was prepared for it, as I warned you with perfect sincerity beforehand.
And a month later:
I thought that if I had written and put on the stage a play so obviously brimming over with monstrous defects, I had lost all instinct and that, therefore, my machinery must have gone wrong for good.
The eventual success of the play, both in the remainder of its first run and in the subsequent staging by the Moscow Art Theatre under Stanislavski, would encourage Chekhov to remain a playwright and lead to the overwhelming success of his next endeavor Uncle Vanya, and indeed to the rest of his dramatic work.

Title 
The English title for the play The Seagull is a potentially misleading translation of the title from its original Russian. Although the words "gull" and "seagull" are often used interchangeably in English, the text of the play makes no mention of the sea and is set on an estate somewhere in the inland regions of central Russia or Ukraine. The titular gull in question was likely meant by Chekov to be a black-headed gull or common gull. A more exact translation of the title would thus be The Gull, as the word "seagull" could erroneously evoke maritime connotations when no such imagery was intended by the playwright.

Characters 

 Irina Nikolayevna Arkadina – an actress, married surname Trepleva
 Konstantin Gavrilovich Treplev – Irina's son, a young man
Pyotr Nikolayevich Sorin – Irina's brother, owner of the country estate
 Nina Mikhailovna Zarechnaya – a young woman, the daughter of a rich landowner
 Ilya Afanasyevich Shamrayev – a retired lieutenant and the manager of Sorin's estate
 Polina Andreyevna – Shamrayev's wife
 Masha – her daughter
 Boris Alexeyevich Trigorin – a novelist
 Yevgeny Sergeyevich Dorn – a doctor
 Semyon Semyonovich Medvedenko – a teacher
 Yakov – a workman
 Cook 
 Maid

Plot

Act I 
Pyotr Sorin is a retired senior civil servant in failing health at his country estate. His sister, actress Irina Arkadina, arrives at the estate for a brief vacation with her lover, the writer Boris Trigorin. Pyotr and his guests gather at an outdoor stage to see an unconventional play that Irina's son, Konstantin Treplev, has written and directed. The play-within-a-play features Nina Zarechnaya, a young woman who lives on a neighboring estate, as the "soul of the world" in a time far in the future. The play is Konstantin's latest attempt at creating a new theatrical form. It is a dense symbolist work. Irina laughs at the play, finding it ridiculous and incomprehensible; the performance ends prematurely after audience interruption and Konstantin storms off in humiliation. Irina does not seem concerned about her son, who has not found his way in the world. Although others ridicule Konstantin's drama, the physician Yevgeny Dorn praises him.

Act I also sets up the play's various romantic triangles. The schoolteacher Semyon Medvedenko loves Masha, the daughter of the estate's steward Ilya Shamrayev and his wife Polina Andryevna. However, Masha is in love with Konstantin, who is in love with Nina, but Nina falls for Trigorin. Polina is in an affair with Yevgeny. When Masha tells Yevgeny about her longing for Konstantin, Yevgeny helplessly blames the lake for making everybody feel romantic.

Act II 
A few days later, in the afternoon, characters are outside the estate. Arkadina, after reminiscing about happier times, engages in a heated argument with the house steward Shamrayev and decides to leave. Nina lingers behind after the group leaves, and Konstantin arrives to give her a gull that he has shot. Nina is confused and horrified at the gift. Konstantin sees Trigorin approaching and leaves in a jealous fit. 

Nina asks Trigorin to tell her about the writer's life; he replies that it is not an easy one. Nina says that she knows the life of an actress is not easy either, but she wants more than anything to be one. Trigorin sees the gull that Konstantin has shot and muses on how he could use it as a subject for a short story: "The plot for the short story: a young girl lives all her life on the shore of a lake. She loves the lake, like a gull, and she's happy and free, like a gull. But a man arrives by chance, and when he sees her, he destroys her, out of sheer boredom. Like this gull." Arkadina calls for Trigorin, and he leaves as she tells him that she has changed her mind – they will not be leaving immediately. Nina lingers behind, enthralled with Trigorin's celebrity and modesty, and gushes, "My dream!"

Act III 
Inside the estate, Arkadina and Trigorin have decided to depart. Between acts Konstantin attempted suicide by shooting himself in the head, but the bullet only grazed his skull. He spends the majority of Act III with his scalp heavily bandaged. 

Nina finds Trigorin eating breakfast and presents him with a medallion that proclaims her devotion to him, using a line from one of Trigorin's own books: "If you ever need my life, come and take it." She retreats after begging for one last chance to see Trigorin before he leaves. Arkadina appears, followed by Sorin, whose health has continued to deteriorate. Trigorin leaves to continue packing. After a brief argument between Arkadina and Sorin, Sorin collapses in grief. He is helped off by Medvedenko. Konstantin enters and asks his mother to change his bandage. As she is doing this, Konstantin disparages Trigorin, eliciting another argument. When Trigorin reenters, Konstantin leaves in tears. 

Trigorin asks Arkadina if they can stay at the estate. She flatters and cajoles him until he agrees to return with her to Moscow. After she has left the room, Nina comes to say her final goodbye to Trigorin and to inform him that she is running away to become an actress against her parents' wishes. They kiss passionately and make plans to meet again in Moscow.

Act IV 
It is winter two years later, in the drawing room that has been converted to Konstantin's study. Masha finally accepted Medvedenko's marriage proposal, and they have a child together, though Masha still nurses an unrequited love for Konstantin. Various characters discuss what has happened in the two years that have passed: Nina and Trigorin lived together in Moscow for a time until he abandoned her and went back to Arkadina. Nina gave birth to Trigorin's baby, but it died in a short time. Nina never achieved any real success as an actress, and she is currently on a tour of the provinces with a small theatre group. Konstantin has had some short stories published, but he is increasingly depressed. Sorin's health is still failing, and the people at the estate have telegraphed for Arkadina to come for his final days. 

Most of the play's characters go to the drawing room to play a game of bingo. Konstantin does not join them, instead working on a manuscript at his desk. After the group leaves to eat dinner, Konstantin hears someone at the back door. He is surprised to find Nina, whom he invites inside. Nina tells Konstantin about her life over the last two years. Konstantin says that he followed Nina. She starts to compare herself to the gull that Konstantin killed in Act II, then rejects that and says "I am an actress." She tells him that she was forced to tour with a second-rate theatre company after the death of the child she had with Trigorin, but she seems to have a newfound confidence. Konstantin pleads with her to stay, but she is in such disarray that his pleading means nothing. She embraces Konstantin, and leaves. Despondent, Konstantin spends two minutes silently tearing up his manuscripts before leaving the study. 

The group reenters and returns to the bingo game. There is a sudden gunshot from off-stage, and Dorn goes to investigate. He returns and takes Trigorin aside. Dorn tells Trigorin to somehow get Arkadina away, for Konstantin has just shot himself.

Performance history

Premiere in St. Petersburg 
The first night of The Seagull on 17 October 1896 at the Alexandrinsky Theatre in Petersburg was a disaster, booed by the audience. The hostile audience intimidated Vera Komissarzhevskaya so severely that she lost her voice. Some considered her the best actor in Russia who, according to Chekhov, had moved people to tears as Nina in rehearsal. The next day, Chekhov, who had taken refuge backstage for the last two acts, announced to Suvorin that he was finished with writing plays. When supporters assured him that later performances were more successful, Chekhov assumed they were just being kind. The Seagull impressed the playwright and friend of Chekhov Vladimir Nemirovich-Danchenko, however, who said Chekhov should have won the Griboyedov prize that year for The Seagull instead of himself.

Moscow Art Theatre production 

Nemirovich overcame Chekhov's refusal to allow the play to appear in Moscow and convinced Stanislavski to direct the play for their innovative and newly founded Moscow Art Theatre in 1898. Stanislavski prepared a detailed directorial score, which indicated when the actors should "wipe away dribble, blow their noses, smack their lips, wipe away sweat, or clean their teeth and nails with matchsticks", as well as organising a tight control of the overall mise en scène. This approach was intended to facilitate the unified expression of the inner action that Stanislavski perceived to be hidden beneath the surface of the play in its subtext. Stanislavski's directorial score was published in 1938.

Stanislavski played Trigorin, while Vsevolod Meyerhold, the future director and practitioner (whom Stanislavski on his death-bed declared to be "my sole heir in the theatre"), played Konstantin, and Olga Knipper (Chekhov's future wife) played Arkadina. The production opened on 17 December 1898 with a sense of crisis in the air in the theatre; most of the actors were mildly self-tranquilised with Valerian drops. In a letter to Chekhov, one audience member described how:

Nemirovich-Danchenko described the applause, which came after a prolonged silence, as bursting from the audience like a dam breaking. The production received unanimous praise from the press.

It was not until 1 May 1899 that Chekhov saw the production, in a performance without sets but in make-up and costumes at the Paradiz Theatre. He praised the production but was less keen on Stanislavski's own performance; he objected to the "soft, weak-willed tone" in his interpretation (shared by Nemirovich) of Trigorin and entreated Nemirovich to "put some spunk into him or something". He proposed that the play be published with Stanislavski's score of the production's mise en scène. Chekhov's collaboration with Stanislavski proved crucial to the creative development of both men. Stanislavski's attention to psychological realism and ensemble playing coaxed the buried subtleties from the play and revived Chekhov's interest in writing for the stage. Chekhov's unwillingness to explain or expand on the script forced Stanislavski to dig beneath the surface of the text in ways that were new in theatre. The Moscow Art Theatre to this day bears the seagull as its emblem to commemorate the historic production that gave it its identity.

Other notable productions 
Uta Hagen made her Broadway debut as Nina, at the age of 18, in a production with Alfred Lunt and Lynn Fontanne in 1938 at the Shubert Theatre.

In November 1992, a Broadway staging directed by Marshall W. Mason opened at Lyceum Theatre, New York. The production starred Tyne Daly as Arkadina, Ethan Hawke as Treplyov, Jon Voight as Trigorin, and Laura Linney as Nina. In 1998, a production by Daniela Thomas, assisted by Luiz Päetow, toured Brazil under the title Da Gaivota, with Fernanda Montenegro as Arkadina, Matheus Nachtergaele as Treplyov, and Fernanda Torres as Nina.

The Joseph Papp Public Theater presented Chekhov's play as part of the New York Shakespeare Festival summer season in Central Park from July 25, 2001 to August 26, 2001. The production, directed by Mike Nichols, starred Meryl Streep as Arkadina, Christopher Walken as Sorin, Philip Seymour Hoffman as Treplyov, John Goodman as Shamrayev, Marcia Gay Harden as Masha, Kevin Kline as Trigorin, Debra Monk as Polina, Stephen Spinella as Medvedenko, and Natalie Portman as Nina.

In early 2007, the Royal Court Theatre staged a production of The Seagull starring Kristin Scott Thomas as Arkadina, Mackenzie Crook as Treplyov and Carey Mulligan as Nina. It also featured Chiwetel Ejiofor and Art Malik. The production was directed by Ian Rickson, and received positive reviews, including The Metro Newspaper calling it "practically perfect". It ran from January 18 to March 17, and Scott Thomas won an Olivier Award for her performance.

In 2007/2008, a production by the Royal Shakespeare Company toured internationally before coming into residence at the West End's New London Theatre until 12 January 2008. It starred William Gaunt and Ian McKellen as Sorin (who alternated with William Gaunt in the role, as McKellen also played the title role in King Lear), Richard Goulding as Treplyov, Frances Barber as Arkadina, Jonathan Hyde as Dorn, Monica Dolan as Masha, and Romola Garai as Nina. Garai in particular received rave reviews, The Independent calling her a "woman on the edge of stardom", and the London Evening Standard calling her "superlative", and stating that the play was "distinguished by the illuminating, psychological insights of Miss Garai's performance."

The Classic Stage Company in New York City revived the work on 13 March 2008 in a production of Paul Schmidt's translation directed by Viacheslav Dolgachev. This production was notable for the casting of Dianne Wiest in the role of Arkadina, and Alan Cumming as Trigorin.

On 16 September 2008, the Walter Kerr Theatre on Broadway began previews of Ian Rickson's production of The Seagull with Kristin Scott Thomas reprising her role as Arkadina. The cast also included Peter Sarsgaard as Trigorin, Mackenzie Crook as Treplyov, Art Malik as Dorn, Carey Mulligan as Nina, Zoe Kazan as Masha, and Ann Dowd as Polina.

In 2011, a new version directed by Golden Mask winner Yuri Butusov debuted at Konstantin Raikin's Satyricon theater, notable for its return to comedy and "Brechtian-style techniques." In 2017 and in coordination with Butusov, a production was filmed and subtitled in English by the Stage Russia project.

The Oregon Shakespeare Festival staged Seagull in the New Theatre from 22 February until 22 June 2012, adapted and directed by Libby Appel.

In 2014, a translation into Afrikaans under the title Die seemeeu, directed by Christiaan Olwagen and starring Sandra Prinsloo, was staged at the Aardklop arts festival in Potchefstroom.

In October 2014, it was announced that the Regent's Park Open Air Theatre would present a new version of The Seagull by Torben Betts in 2015. The play opened on 19 June 2015 and received critical acclaim for its design by Jon Bausor and the new adaptation by Betts.

In January 2015, Toronto's Crow's Theatre produced The Seagull in association with Canadian Stage and The Company Theatre. Helmed by Crow's Theatre's Artistic Director Chris Abraham, the creative team was composed of set and costume designer Julie Fox, lighting designer Kimberly Purtell and sound designer Thomas Ryder Payne. The Robert Falls adaptation, based on a translation by George Calderon, featured an all-star Canadian cast:

 Yanna McIntosh as Arkadina
 Philip Riccio as Konstantin
 Eric Peterson as Sorin
 Christine Horne as Nina
 Tara Nicoderma as Polina
 Tony Nappo as Shamrayev
 Bahia Watson as Masha
 Tom Rooney as Trigorin
 Tom McCamus as Dorn
 Gregory Prest as Medvedenko
 Marcus Jamin as Yakov

In March 2015, Hurrah Hurrah and the Hot Blooded Theatre Company presented The Seagull in an unused shop-front with the help of The Rocks Pop-up.

In 2017, a new version by Simon Stephens was staged at the Lyric Hammersmith in London, starring Lesley Sharp as Irina.

In 2020, Anya Reiss's adaptation of The Seagull began previews on 11 March in the Playhouse Theatre, starring Emilia Clarke as Nina and Indira Varma as Irina. The production was suspended on 16 March due to the COVID-19 pandemic but subsequently reopened at the Harold Pinter Theatre in July 2022 and ran until September. Also in 2020, the Auckland Theatre Company presented an on-line production during the COVID-19 lock down, using the device of a Zoom meeting for the stage. It was adapted by Eli Kent and Eleanor Bishop, who also directed it, with rehearsals and performances carried out online. It was well received by critics around the world, with The Scotsman declaring it one of the "best plays to watch online."

In March 2021, the Crane Creations Theatre Company led a play reading with its professional theatre artist team on its monthly Play Date. The Play Date aims to raise awareness and appreciation of playwrights from around the world.

Analysis and criticism 

It has been remarked that the play was "a spectacle of waste" (such as at the beginning of the play when Medvedenko asks Masha why she always wear black, she answers "Because I'm in mourning for my life.").

The play also has an intertextual relationship with Shakespeare's Hamlet. Arkadina and Treplyov quote lines from it before the play-within-a-play in the first act (and this device is itself used in Hamlet). There are many allusions to Shakespearean plot details as well. For instance, Treplyov seeks to win his mother back from the usurping older man Trigorin much as Hamlet tries to win Queen Gertrude back from his uncle Claudius.

Translation 
The Seagull was first translated into English for a performance at the Royalty Theatre, Glasgow, in November 1909. Since that time, there have been numerous translations of the text—from 1998 to 2004 alone there were 25 published versions. In the introduction of his own version, Tom Stoppard wrote: "You can't have too many English Seagulls: at the intersection of all of them, the Russian one will be forever elusive." In fact, the problems start with the title of the play: there's no sea anywhere near the play's settings, – so the bird in question was in all likelihood a lake-dwelling gull such as the common gull (larus canus), rather than a nautical variant. In Russian both kinds of birds are named , simply meaning "gull", as in English. However, the name persists as it is much more euphonious in English than the much shorter and blunter sounding "The Gull", which comes across as too forceful and direct to represent the encompassing vague and partially hidden feelings beneath the surface. Therefore, the faint reference to the sea has been seen as a more fitting representation of the intent of the play. 

Some early translations of The Seagull have come under criticism from modern Russian scholars. The Marian Fell translation, in particular, has been criticized for its elementary mistakes and total ignorance of Russian life and culture. Peter France, translator and author of the book The Oxford Guide to Literature in English Translation, wrote of Chekhov's multiple adaptations:

Notable English translations

Adaptations

Theatre 
The American playwright Tennessee Williams adapted the play as The Notebook of Trigorin, which premiered in 1981. That year, Thomas Kilroy's adaptation, The Seagull also premiered at the Royal Court Theatre in London. The Canadian playwright Daniel MacIvor wrote an adaptation called His Greatness.

In 2004, American playwright Regina Taylor's African-American adaptation, Drowning Crow, was performed on Broadway.

Emily Mann wrote and directed an adaptation called A Seagull in the Hamptons. The play premiered at the McCarter Theatre May 2008.

Libby Appel did a new version that premiered in 2011 at the Marin Theatre in Mill Valley using newly discovered material from Chekhov's original manuscripts. In pre-Revolutionary Russia, plays underwent censorship from two sources, the government censor and directors. The removed passages were saved in the archives of Russia, and unavailable till the fall of the Iron Curtain.

In 2011, Benedict Andrews re-imagined the work as being set in a modern Australian beach in his production of the play at Sydney's Belvoir Theatre, which starred Judy Davis, David Wenham and Maeve Darmody. He did this to explore the ideas of liminal space and time.

In October 2011, it was announced that a contemporary Hamptons-set film adaptation, Relative Insanity, will be directed by the acting coach Larry Moss, starring David Duchovny, Helen Hunt, Maggie Grace and Joan Chen.

In 2013, a deconstruction of the play by Aaron Posner, set in the modern day under the title Stupid Fucking Bird, was premiered at the Woolly Mammoth Theatre Company in Washington, D.C.; it won the 2014 Charles MacArthur Award for Outstanding New Play or Musical and has been staged widely across American theatres.

A 2022 gender fluid adaptation of the Tom Stoppard version was completed by the Doris Place Players to great success in Los Angeles.

In 2022, Emilia Clarke starred in Anya Reiss’ adaption in Harold Pinter Theatre in London. It was described as a unique 21st century modernisation.

Thomas Bradshaw wrote a modern day adaptation set in New York's Hudson Valley entitled The Seagull/Woodstock, NY. The play was produced Off-Broadway by The New Group in 2023 and starred Parker Posey, Nat Wolff, Ato Essandoh, and Hari Nef.

Film 
Sidney Lumet's 1968 film The Sea Gull used Moura Budberg's translation. The play was also adapted as the Russian film The Seagull in 1972.

The 2003 film La petite Lili from director Claude Miller, starring Ludivine Sagnier as Nina renamed Lili, updates Chekhov's play to contemporary France in the world of the cinema.

Christian Camargo directed a 2014 film adaptation of the play, titled Days and Nights, set in rural New England during the 1980s. The film starred Camargo, William Hurt, Allison Janney, Katie Holmes, Mark Rylance, and Juliet Rylance.

An American film titled The Seagull went into production in 2015. It was released on May 11, 2018, by Sony Pictures Classics; directed by Michael Mayer with a screenplay by Stephen Karam, starring Annette Bening and Saoirse Ronan.

A contemporary Afrikaans-language film adaptation directed by Christiaan Olwagen, titled Die Seemeeu, debuted at the Kyknet Silwerskermfees on 23 August 2018. Cintaine Schutte won the Best Supporting Actress award for her portrayal of Masha.

Opera  
The play was the basis for the 1974 opera The Seagull by Thomas Pasatieri to an English libretto by Kenward Elmslie.

Musical 
The 1987 musical Birds of Paradise by Winnie Holzman and David Evans is a metatheatrical adaptation, both loosely following the original play and containing a musical version of the play as the Konstantin equivalent's play.

In 2015, the play was adapted into Songbird, a country musical by Michael Kimmel and Lauren Pritchard.  Songbird sets its story in Nashville and centers around Tammy Trip, a fading country star.  Tammy returns to the honky tonk where she got her start to help her estranged son launch his own music career.  The show was produced at 59E59 Theaters and featured Kate Baldwin and Erin Dilly.  It was recognized as a New York Times Critic's Pick.

Ballet 
It was made into a ballet by John Neumeier with his Hamburg Ballet company in June 2002. This version re-imagined the main characters as coming from the world of dance. Arkadina became a famous prima ballerina, Nina was a young dancer on the brink of her career. Konstantin appeared as a revolutionary young choreographer and Trigorin as an older, more conventional choreographer.

An earlier ballet in two acts, by Russian composer Rodion Shchedrin, was first performed at the Bolshoi Theatre, Moscow in 1980.

References 

Notes

Sources

External links 

 
 
 Full text of The Seagull in the original Russian
 Cast List of 2007/8 RSC Production
 
 The 120th Anniversary of Chekhov's The Seagull

1896 plays
Plays by Anton Chekhov
Plays adapted into operas
Plays adapted into ballets
Russian plays adapted into films
Tragedy plays